Waco, Texas is a city in the U.S.

Waco or WACO may also refer to:

Related to Native Americans
Waco tribe, a Native American subtribe of the Wichita people
A dialect of the Wichita language

Places in the United States
Waco, Georgia, a city
Waco, Indiana, unincorporated community
Waco, Kentucky, an unincorporated community
Waco, Missouri, a city
Waco, Montana, a populated place and former town site
Waco, Nebraska, a village
Waco, North Carolina, a town
Waco, Ohio, an unincorporated community
Waco, Tennessee, an unincorporated community
Lake Waco, a reservoir in Waco, Texas
Waco Township, Sedgwick County, Kansas

Business
Waco Aircraft Company, a U.S. aircraft manufacturer
Waco (toymaker), a defunct toy company which released the first commercially available electronic handheld game in 1972
Waco, a previous name of the Dr Pepper soft drink

Film and television
 Waco (1952 film), starring Wild Bill Elliott
 Waco (1966 film), a Western starring Jane Russell and Howard Keel
 Waco, the Big Lie, a 1993 American documentary about the Waco siege directed by Linda Thompson
 Waco II, the Big Lie Continues, a 1994 follow up sequel addressing criticisms of the original
 Waco: The Rules of Engagement, a 1997 documentary about the Waco siege (see below)
 Waco (miniseries), a 2018 American miniseries about the Waco siege

Music
Waco (album), a 2016 album by Violent Soho
Western Australian Charity Orchestra or WACO, in Perth, Western

Radio stations
WACO (AM), in Waco, Texas, now KCLE (AM) in Burleson
WACO-FM, an FM radio station in Waco, Texas

Other uses
Waco siege, the 1993 U.S. government assault on the compound of David Koresh and the Branch Davidians
Waco High School, Waco, Texas

See also
Wacol (disambiguation)
Wako (disambiguation)